"Flirtin' with Disaster" is a song by the southern rock band Molly Hatchet and written by three members of the band. It is Molly Hatchet's most famous song and remained on the Billboard Hot 100 for 10 weeks, peaking at number 42. It was the only single from the band's second album of the same name. 

The song has appeared in the films Suspect Zero,  The Dukes of Hazzard, Straw Dogs, and Artie Lange's Beer League, and the video games NASCAR 98 and Rock Band. It has also appeared in My Name Is Earl, Supernatural and King of the Hill. The song is also alluded to in the title of a season-two episode of Danny Phantom.

A re-recorded version appears on the band's 2011 compilation Greatest Hits II.

Track listing
7" single

American promo single

Australian promo single

Personnel
Danny Joe Brown – vocals
Dave Hlubek – guitar
Steve Holland – guitar
Duane Roland – guitar
Banner Thomas – bass
Bruce Crump – drums

References

1979 songs
1980 singles
Song recordings produced by Tom Werman
Epic Records singles